Admont Abbey is a Benedictine monastery located on the Enns River in the town of Admont, Austria. The oldest remaining monastery in Styria, Admont Abbey contains the largest monastic library in the world as well as a long-established scientific collection. It is known for its Baroque architecture, art, and manuscripts.

The abbey's location on the borders of the mountainous Gesäuse National Park (the name Admont derives from the Latin expression "ad montes", which means "at the mountains") is of unusual scenic beauty.

History

Dedicated to Saint Blaise, Admont Abbey was founded in 1074 by Archbishop Gebhard of Salzburg with the legacy of the late Saint Hemma of Gurk, and settled by monks from St. Peter's Abbey in Salzburg under abbot Isingrin. The second abbot, Giselbert, is said to have introduced the Cluniac reforms here. Another of the early abbots, Wolfhold, established a convent for the education of girls of noble families, and the educational tradition has remained strong ever since. The monastery prospered during the Middle Ages and possessed a productive scriptorium. Abbot Engelbert of Admont (1297–1327) was a famous scholar and author of many works.

The wars against the Turks and the Reformation (Abbot Valentine was obliged to resign because of his Reformed views) caused a lengthy decline, but with the Counter-Reformation the abbey flourished once again. In addition to the secondary school, which later moved to Judenburg, there were faculties of theology and philosophy. Abbot Albert von Muchar was well known as an historian and taught at the University of Graz.

In the 17th and 18th centuries, the abbey reached a high point of artistic productivity, with the works of the world-famous ecclesiastical embroiderer Brother Benno Haan (1631–1720) and the sculptor Josef Stammel.

On 27 April 1865, a disastrous fire destroyed almost the entire monastery. While the monastic archives burned, the library could be salvaged. Reconstruction began the following year but was still not complete by 1890.

The economic crises of the 1930s forced the abbey to sell off many of its art treasures, and during the period of the National Socialist government the monastery was dissolved and the monks evicted. They were able to return in 1946 and the abbey today is again a thriving Benedictine community.

From 1641, the abbey was a member of the Salzburg Congregation, which in 1930 was merged into the present Austrian Congregation of the Benedictine Confederation.

Abbey church

The present church was designed by the architect Wilhelm Bücher to replace the former church after the fire of 1865. It is inspired by Regensburg Cathedral and was the first sacred building in Austria in the neo-Gothic style. It incorporates 12th century Romanesque side doors. The two west towers are 67 metres tall, and the facade contains figures of Saint Benedict and Saint Scholastica. The figure of the church's patron, Saint Blaise, tops the pinnacle of the west door.

The interior consists of a central aisle and two side aisles, off each of which are five side chapels and six altars. The picture on the altar of Mary, Maria Immaculata by Martino Altomonte (1657–1745), is surrounded by 15 carved medallions of the secrets of the rosary by Stammel. Both works of art were created in 1726 and survived the fire of 1856.

In a side chapel is located the famous crib of Admont, also by Stammel. It is open to view from 25 December to 2 February. The Gothic crucifix under the triumphal arch dated 1518 is ascribed to Andreas Lackner.

A statue of Saint Blaise stands on top of the high altar of white Carrara marble. The choir is decorated with early 18th century tapestries by Benno Haan. In the Chapel of St. Benedict is a Baroque Corpus Christi from the workshop of Johann Meinrad Guggenbichler.

Present day
The community at Admont consists of over 27 monks under Abbot Bruno Hubl. The abbey is responsible for 27 parishes, runs a secondary school with about 600 pupils and a senior citizen's home in Frauenberg. Its various businesses and enterprises employ about 500 people, and it also has the management of the museums and collections detailed below.

Library

The library hall, built in 1776 to designs by the architect Joseph Hueber, is 70 metres long, 14 metres wide and 13 metres high, and is the largest monastery library in the world. It contains c. 70,000 volumes of the monastery's entire holdings of c. 200,000 volumes. The ceiling consists of seven cupolas, decorated with frescoes by Bartolomeo Altomonte showing the stages of human knowledge up to the high point of Divine Revelation. Light is provided by 48 windows and is reflected by the original colour scheme of gold and white. The architecture and design express the ideals of the Enlightenment, against which the sculptures by Joseph Stammel of "The Four Last Things" make a striking contrast.

The abbey possesses over 1,400 manuscripts, the oldest of which, from St. Peter's Abbey in Salzburg, were the gift of the founder, Archbishop Gebhard, and accompanied the first monks to settle here, as well as over 900 incunabulae.

Burials
 Gebhard of Salzburg
 Engelbert of Admont
 Anastasia of Kiev

Museums

Since the Baroque period the abbots had accumulated a collection of "curiosities" and scientific specimens of various sorts, which were entirely destroyed in the fire of 1865. As part of the reconstruction, Father Gabriel Strobl determined to replace the lost collections, and so formed the nucleus of the modern museums. Father Strobl was himself a botanist but also worked on building up the insect collection, so much so that he became one of the great entomologists of his day. The Natural History museum now contains over 250,000 insect specimens, including one of the three largest collections of flies, or Diptera, in Europe. Other collections of, for example, minerals and rock, and exotic species, have also been formed.

The abbey also houses two major art collections of Historical and Modern Art. The historical art collection was begun in 1959 by Father Adalbert Krause, and has been significantly augmented since 1980. The present museum was opened in 2003. The collection particularly features ecclesiastical art, and contains for example many works of ecclesiastical embroidery by the famous craftsman Benno Haan and of the abbey sculptor Joseph Stammel.

Since 1997, the abbey has also been building up a collection of contemporary art, largely produced by young Austrian artists and often specially designed for the abbey premises.

Gallery

See also
Library of Trinity College Dublin

Further reading
 Michael Braunsteiner (ed.) Barockbildhauer Josef Stammel 1695–1765. Benediktinerstift Admont 1997
 Michael Braunsteiner, Gerald Unterberger, P. Winfried Schwab, Klosterführer/Monastery Guide, Admont 2006
 Abt Bruno Hubl, Michael Braunsteiner, Admont, Ein Fotoportät von Rudi Molacek, Admont 2003, 
 Adalbert Krause Stift Admont. Kolorit, Wien 1974, 
 Rudolf List Stift Admont 1074–1974. Festschrift zur Neunhundertjahrfeier. OÖ. Landesverlag, Ried im Innkreis 1974
 Hannes P. Naschenweng "Admont". In: Die Benediktinischen Mönchs- und Nonnenklöster in Österreich und Südtirol, bearb. von Ulrich Faust, Waltraud Krassnig, = Germania Benedictina 3/1, St. Ottilien 2000, 71-188
 Hannes P. Naschenweng "Admont, Frauenkloster". In: Die Benediktinischen Mönchs- und Nonnenklöster in Österreich und Südtirol, bearb. von Ulrich Faust, Waltraud Krassnig, = Germania Benedictina 3/1, St. Ottilien 2000, 189-212
 Bernhard Sebl: Besitz der „toten Hand“. Entziehung und Restitution des Vermögens der Benediktinerstifte Admont und St. Lambrecht. = Veröffentlichungen des Steiermärkischen Landesarchivs 32, Graz 2004
 Johann Tomaschek, et al. Benediktinerstift Admont. Sehenswürdigkeiten und Sammlungen. Benediktinerstift Admont 1990

References

External links

Admont Abbey website
CastYourArt's audio interview with the curator, Dr. Michael Braunsteiner, of the museum of contemporary art in the Admont Monastery 

Benedictine monasteries in Austria
Libraries in Austria
Monasteries in Styria
1070s establishments in the Holy Roman Empire
1074 establishments in Europe
Christian monasteries established in the 11th century
Museums in Styria
Natural history museums in Austria
Art museums and galleries in Austria
Art museums established in 2003